Lorinda and Laurinda are female first names. They may refer to:

People 

Lorinda Munson Bryant (1855-1933), American writer and educator
Laura Cardoso, born Laurinda de Jesus Cardoso (born 1927), Brazilian actress
 Lorinda Cherry, computer scientist
 Lorinda de Roulet (born 1931/1932), American philanthropist
 Anna Etheridge, born Lorinda Anna Blair (1839-1913), American Civil War nurse
Laurinda Mphoko, wife of Phelekezela Mphoko, Zimbabwean politician
 Lorinda Panther (born 1963), New Zealand footballer
 Lorinda Perry (1884-1951), American economist, lawyer, professor
 Laurinda Hope Spear (b. 1950), American architect
 Lorinda Theron (born 1967), daughter of Annique Theron, South African businesswoman

Fictional characters 

 Laurinda (2014), a novel by Alice Pung

Feminine given names
English feminine given names